Berlin Nights Grand Delusions (Lebenspornografie) (2003) is a feature film written and directed by Dutch director Edwin Brienen. The 89-minutes uncut version contains nudity, pornographic scenes, and a scatological opening sequence by shock performer Jean-Louis Costes. The film was released on DVD in 2008.

Plot
A group of Amsterdam artists try to set up an erotic show in a Berlin nightclub. When the show flops, the group fades away into alcohol abuse and sexual excesses. The Virgin Mary manifests herself to the group and offers them happiness.

Production
Enormous costs, personal affairs and lawsuits about the rights of the film took a total of almost three years before the film had its official German premiere in the Summer of 2005.

Soundtrack
The soundtrack of the film is composed by Le Syndicat Electronique, released on LP through the French electro label Invasion Planète Recordings.

External links 

Dutch drama films
2003 films